Under the Sun is the second album by Australian rock group Paul Kelly & The Coloured Girls and was originally released in December 1987 by Mushroom Records. In the North American and European markets, it was released by A&M Records in 1988 with the band credited as Paul Kelly & The Messengers, with a different track order and listing.

On the Australian albums charts it peaked at #19 with the single "To Her Door" peaking at #14. Another single, "Dumb Things" peaked at #36 in early 1989, on the Australian Recording Industry Association (ARIA) singles charts; it reached #16 on the Billboard Modern Rock chart. The song was included in the soundtrack for the 1988  Yahoo Serious film Young Einstein.

"To Her Door" won an ARIA Award in 1988 for 'Best Video' directed by Claudia Castle. In 2001, the Australasian Performing Right Association (APRA) listed the Top 30 Australian songs of all time, including "To Her Door" written by Kelly.

Background
After relocating from Melbourne to Sydney in 1985, Paul Kelly began to play and record with a full-time band, which included Michael Armiger on bass guitar, Michael Barclay on drums, Steve Connolly on guitar, eventually bassist Jon Schofield, and keyboardist Peter Bull joined. Through a joke based on Lou Reed's song "Walk on the Wild Side", the band became known as Paul Kelly and the Coloured Girls. In September 1986 the band released their debut double LP Gossip. Due to possible racist connotations the band changed its name, for international releases, to Paul Kelly and the Messengers. They made an American tour, initially supporting Crowded House and then head-lining, travelling across the United States by bus. Jon Schofield replaced Armiger on bass guitar, Chris Coyne on tenor saxophone and Chris Wilson on harmonica

On the Australian albums charts it peaked at #19 with the single "To Her Door" peaking at #14. First single from the album, "Bradman" had been released in January 1987 as a double-A side with "Leaps and Bounds" from Gossip but had little chart success. The third and fourth singles, "Forty Miles to Saturday Night" and "Don't Stand So Close to the Window" also had little chart success. Another single, "Dumb Things" peaked at #36 in early 1989, on the Australian Recording Industry Association (ARIA) singles charts; it reached #16 on the Billboard Modern Rock chart. The song was included in the soundtrack for the 1988  Yahoo Serious film Young Einstein.

In 1988, "To Her Door" won an ARIA Award for 'Best Video' directed by Claudia Castle. In 2001, the Australasian Performing Right Association (APRA) listed the Top 30 Australian songs of all time, including "To Her Door" written by Kelly.

"Desdemona" was featured in an episode of the Australian TV show Packed To The Rafters.

Track listing
All tracks written by Paul Kelly unless otherwise indicated.

Original Australian LP/MC release
 "Dumb Things" (aka "I've Done all the Dumb Things) – 2:31
 "Same Old Walk" – 4:08
 "Big Heart" – 3:22
 "Don't Stand So Close to the Window" (Paul Kelly, A McGregor) – 2:35
 "Forty Miles to Saturday Night" – 3:11
 "I Don't Remember a Thing" – 2:04
 "Know Your Friends" – 3:37
 "To Her Door" – 3:18
 "Under the Sun" – 4:18
 "Untouchable" – 2:04
 "Desdemona" – 3:46
 "Happy Slave" – 2:30
 "Crosstown" – 2:23
 "Bicentennial" – 3:04

Bonus tracks for Australian CD release
  "Bradman" – 7:26
 "Pastures of Plenty" (Woody Guthrie) – 2:26

North American/European release
 "Dumb Things" – 2:31 ^^
 "Same Old Walk" – 4:08
 "Big Heart" – 3:22
 "Don't Stand So Close to the Window" (Paul Kelly, A McGregor) – 2:35
 "Forty Miles to Saturday Night" – 3:11 ^^
 "Untouchable" – 2:04
 "Know Your Friends" – 3:37
 "To Her Door" – 3:18 ^^
 "Under the Sun" – 4:18
 "Desdemona" – 2:07
 "Happy Slave" – 3:46
 "Crosstown" – 2:30
 "Little Decisions" – 2:25
 "Bicentennial" – 3:04

(^^) The European release featured slightly different mixes of these tracks.

Personnel
Paul Kelly and the Coloured Girls
 Paul Kelly — acoustic guitar, vocals
 Michael Barclay  — drums, vocals
 Peter Bull — keyboards
 Steve Connolly — guitar (electric), vocals
 Chris Coyne — saxophone (tenor)
 Jon Schofield — bass guitar
 Chris Wilson — harmonica, vocals, saxophone (baritone)

Additional musicians
 Jessica Kenny — vocals
 Joe Camilleri — saxophone (tenor)
 Steve Miller — whistle (human)
 Lucky Oceans — guitar (steel)
 Ian Simpson — banjo

Recording details
 Producer — Alan Thorne and Paul Kelly except "Dumb Things", produced by Martin Armiger and Paul Kelly
 Engineer — Alan Thorne
 Assistant engineer — Kathy Naunton
 Recording & mixing studio — Alberts and Trafalgar Studios

Art work
Design — Melanie Nissen
Photography — Francine McDougall (cover photo), Isabel Snyder

Charts

Certifications

Release history

References

1987 albums
Paul Kelly (Australian musician) albums
Mushroom Records albums